Heptium is a genus of crested millipedes in the family Schizopetalidae. There are at least two described species in Heptium.

Species
 Heptium carinellum Loomis, 1937
 Heptium scamillatum Loomis, 1937

References

Further reading

 
 
 
 

Callipodida
Millipede genera